Dante Spencer (born 1976) is an American model and comedic actor, model and male pageant titleholder who concludes as second runner-up at Mister World 2000.

Acting

As an actor, he has appeared in Dating Games People Play (2006) and In a Different Key (2008).  He also landed roles on television series shows such as Sabrina, the Teenage Witch, The Andy Dick Show, Half & Half, Jerks With Cameras and The Real.

Spencer caught media attention in the summer of 2005 when he dated American Idol judge Paula Abdul, whom he escorted to the Emmy awards.

Dante Spencer is graduated from UCSD where he minored in Biology with an emphasis in Nutrition. He was a nutritionist for many years and holds several health and fitness related certifications (NSCA CSCS, APEX, NASM). He's been featured on the cover of Men's Health magazine three times and received his master's degree in Spiritual Psychology.

Filmography
Television
 The Andy Dick Show Rufus (1 episode, 2001)
 The Nick Cannon Show (1 episode, 2002)
 Sabrina, the Teenage Witch (1 episode, 2002)
 Half & Half (1 episode, 2006)
 Jerks With Cameras (10 episodes, 2014)
 The Real (5 episodes, 2015)

Film
Dating Games People Play (2006)
In a Different Key (2008)
The Jokesters (2015)

Published works
How to Lose Weight in Your Sleep: Easy No Diet Weight Loss Secrets to Be at Your Dream Weight

References

External links
 
 Dante Spencer's fan egroup

American male models
Male beauty pageant winners
University of California, San Diego alumni
American nutritionists
American health and wellness writers
Living people
Place of birth missing (living people)
1976 births
Date of birth missing (living people)